Akbar Khan is a recipient of India's National Award for The Welfare of Persons with Disability in 1989.

Early life and education
Akbar Khan was born on 16 August 1962 in a Muslim family to Kistoor Khan, a farmer and Rahmat Begum, a housewife, at Bangasar, located in the Indian state of Rajasthan.

Family and personal life
Khan married Dr. Rana Ruknuddin(Gausia Sultana), who did her Ph.D. from Aligarh Muslim University.

Awards and honors

References

External links 

 

1962 births
Indian disability rights activists
Indian blind people
Indian bankers
Living people
People from Hanumangarh district
People from Bikaner district
Rajasthani people
Indian Sunni Muslims
Activists from Rajasthan
20th-century Indian male singers
20th-century Indian singers
Indian classical composers
20th-century Indian composers
Musicians from Rajasthan
21st-century Indian male singers
21st-century Indian singers
21st-century Indian composers
Indian male composers
Indian male ghazal singers